DZST (860 kHz) was an AM radio station owned and operated by the University of Santo Tomas in the Philippines. It also served both as a campus station and as a Catholic station.

The station was housed in the Main Building of the campus and broadcast from 1950 to 1969. The frequency was formerly occupied by Radyo Veritas (which is also a Catholic-run station).

UST Tiger Radio

In the late 2000s, UST through its Tomasian Cable Television (TOMCAT, now known as the Tiger Media Network) launched UST Tiger Radio. UST Tiger Radio currently broadcasts online via web streaming from Monday to Friday, except during semester breaks. It is also the current official campus station of the UST community.

See also
Timeline of the History of the University of Santo Tomas

References

College radio stations in the Philippines
University of Santo Tomas
Internet radio stations in the Philippines
Radio stations established in 1950
Radio stations disestablished in 1969
Defunct radio stations in Metro Manila